The 2022–23 Ottawa Senators season is the 31st season of the Ottawa Senators of the National Hockey League (NHL).

Team business 
The National Capital Commission (NCC) resumed the process to redevelop the LeBreton Flats overall site, reserving the site of an arena and asking for preliminary bids on the arena site separately. After a February 2022 deadline to submit bids, the NCC announced that it had received several bids for the site. Local media speculated that the Senators were actively pursuing a bid, authorized by Melnyk shortly before his death. In June 2022, the NCC accepted the Senators' proposal for a new downtown arena and mixed-use development as part of the Lebreton Flats redevelopment. The team will lease the land for their development. Construction is not expected before 2024 after a leasing agreement is finalized and municipal review of the project is completed. The lease agreement is expected to be put in place by autumn of 2023. In related business, the outstanding lawsuits around the previous LeBreton bid were settled out of court in December 2022.

The team parted ways with their ECHL affiliate Atlanta Gladiators and signed an affiliation agreement with the Allen Americans.

In November 2022, it was reported that Eugene Melnyk's daughters, and heirs to his estate, had engaged Galatioto Sports Partners, a New York City investment banker, to facilitate a sale of the team. The Senators confirmed the planned sale on November 5, with a condition of sale being that the team remain in Ottawa. On November 7, Canadian actor Ryan Reynolds disclosed publicly that he was interested in being part of the consortium to purchase the team.

Also in November 2022, it was announced that Chris Neil's jersey #25 will be retired in February 2023.

Off-season
The Senators began the off-season being very active in trades and personnel changes. On the first day of the entry draft, the team acquired scoring forward Alex DeBrincat from the Chicago Blackhawks, giving up their first-round and second-round picks in 2022 and a third-round pick in 2024. On July 11, 2022, the team traded away goaltender Matt Murray to the Toronto Maple Leafs. The following day, the Senators acquired goaltender Cam Talbot from the Minnesota Wild in exchange for Filip Gustavsson.

The team also bought out forward Colin White and defenceman Michael Del Zotto. The team previously told forwards Chris Tierney, Adam Gaudette, and Tyler Ennis as well as defenceman Victor Mete that they would not be re-signed. Connor Brown was traded to the Washington Capitals for a second-round pick in the 2024 draft.

On the first day of free agency, the team signed free agent forward Claude Giroux. The next day, the team re-signed centre Josh Norris to an eight-year contract extension. The team added veterans Tyler Motte and Derick Brassard to complement the roster.

Former Senators defenceman Wade Redden was hired as a development coach, joining former Senators players Shean Donovan and Jesse Winchester as development coaches.

Standings

Divisional standings

Conference standings

Schedule and results

Preseason
The pre-season schedule was published on July 1, 2022.

Regular season
The regular season schedule was published on July 6, 2022.

Players statistics
As of March 12, 2023

Skaters

Goaltenders

†Denotes player spent time with another team before joining the Senators. Stats reflect time with the Senators only.
‡No longer with the Senators.

Player roster

Awards and milestones

Transactions
The Senators have been involved in the following transactions during the 2022–23 season.

Key:

 Contract is entry-level.
 Contract initially takes effect in the 2023–24 season.

Entry Draft picks

The 2022 NHL Entry Draft was held July 7–8, 2022 at the Bell Centre arena in Montreal, Quebec, Canada. The Senators traded their first-round pick and second-round pick to acquire Alex DeBrincat. The Senators' first pick was made in the second round - defenceman Filip Nordberg with the 64th-overall pick. The team had nine selections overall.

References

Ottawa Senators seasons
2022–23 NHL season by team
Senators
2022 in Ontario
2023 in Ontario